Qambar, is the headquarter of the Qambar Shahdadkot District of Sindh. It has a district court and district level government offices. The town is also famous due to a large following of the living saint Saien Hussain Shah.

History
Qamber town was part of Larkana District until December 2004 when the Sindh government announced the creation of a new district and made it the capital of the new Qambar-Shahdad Kot District.

See also
 Qambar Shahdadkot District
 Shahdadkot Tehsil

References

Populated places in Qambar Shahdadkot District